"The Fear" is a song by British singer-songwriter Ben Howard from his debut studio album Every Kingdom. It was released as a single in the United Kingdom on 5 December 2011 as a digital download and on CD. The song was written by Ben Howard and produced by Chris Bond and Jason Howes. The cover art was designed by Owen Tozer.

In December 2012, the single was certified gold by the Belgian Entertainment Association.

Music video
A music video to accompany the release of "The Fear" was released on YouTube on 22 June 2011 with a total length of four minutes and thirty-five seconds.

Track listing

Charts

Weekly charts

Year-end charts

Certifications

Release history

References

2011 singles
Ben Howard songs
Songs written by Ben Howard
2011 songs
Island Records singles